The IV Army Corps "Thrace" is an army corps of the Hellenic Army. Established before the First World War, it served in all conflicts Greece participated in until the German invasion of Greece in 1941. Re-established in 1976, it has been guarding the Greco-Turkish land border along the Evros River, and is the most powerful formation in the Hellenic Army.

History
The IV Army Corps was established by Royal Decree on 23 December 1913 (O.S.) at Kavala, Eastern Macedonia, during the reorganization of the Hellenic Army following the Balkan Wars. When Eastern Macedonia was occupied by Bulgarian and German forces during World War I, the entire Corps, under its commander Col. Ioannis Hatzopoulos, demobilized and forbidden to offer resistance by the government in Athens, was carried by rail to Görlitz, Germany, as "guests" of the German Government, where they remained for almost three years.

During the Greco-Turkish War it was renamed the Army of Thrace and was stationed in Adrianople. In 1922, after the defeat of the Hellenic forces in Asia Minor, it covered the withdrawal of many units to Thrace, and formed part of the Army of Evros.

In November 1940, during the Greco-Italian War, it was renamed again as Eastern Macedonia Army Section (ΤΣΑΜ) joining the rest of the army which was fighting in Albania. In April 1941 it surrendered to German forces.

In 1976 the Corps was reformed in Xanthi and currently is the most powerful formation of the Hellenic Army.

Structure

  IV Army Corps,  headquartered at Xanthi, Thrace consisting of
1st Artillery Regiment-MLRS (1o ΣΠΒ), based at Drama, Macedonia
 HQ Company (ΛΔ/1ο ΣΠΒ)
 193rd Multiple Rocket Launcher Battalion (193 ΜΠΕΠ)
 194th Multiple Rocket Launcher Battalion (194 ΜΠΕΠ)
 Observation Battery (ΠΠΑΠ)
 1st Communications, EW, Surveillance Regiment (1ο ΣΕΗΠΠΕΠ), based at Xanthi, Thrace
  Corps Field and Air Defense Artillery Command and units (ΔΠΒ/Δ' ΣΣ)
 Corps Engineer Command and units (ΔΜΧ/Δ' ΣΣ)
 Corps HQ Battalion
 12th Mechanized Infantry Division (Greece) (XII Μ/Κ ΜΠ), based at Alexandroupoli, Thrace organised in
7th Mechanized Infantry Brigade "Sarantaporos" (7η M/K ΤΑΞ Σαραντάπορος), based at Lykofytos, Thrace
 31st Mechanized Infantry Brigade "Kamia" (31η M/K ΤΑΞ Κάμια), based at Feres, Thrace
23rd Armored Brigade "3rd Cavalry Regiment Dorylaeum" (XXIII ΤΘΤ 3ο Σύνταγμα Ιππικού Δορύλαιον), based at Alexandroupoli, Thrace
Tactical Command/41st Infantry Regiment (ΤΔ/41ο ΣΠ), based at Samothraki, North Aegean
3rd Armoured Cavalry Squadron  (Γ' ΕΑΝ)
Division Artillery Command and units (ΔΠΒ/ΧΙΙ Μ/Κ ΜΠ)
12th Signal Battalion (12ο ΤΔΒ)
Division HQ Company (ΛΣ/ΧΙΙ Μ/Κ ΜΠ)
 16th Mechanized Infantry Division (XVI Μ/Κ ΜΠ), based at Didymoteicho, Thrace organised in
3rd Mechanized Infantry Brigade "Rimini" (3η M/K ΤΑΞ Ρίμινι), based at Kavyli, Thrace
 30th Mechanized Infantry Brigade "Tomoritsa" (30ή M/K ΤΑΞ Τομορίτσα), based at Lagos, Thrace
21st Armored Brigade "Cavalry Brigade Pindus" (XXI ΤΘΤ Ταξιαρχία Ιππικού Πίνδος), based at Komotini, Thrace
Tactical Command/21st Infantry Regiment "Drama" (ΤΔ/21ο ΣΠ Δράμα), based at Orestiada, Thrace
4th Armoured Cavalry Squadron  (Δ' ΕΑΝ)
Division Artillery Command and units (ΔΠΒ/XVI Μ/Κ ΜΠ)
16th Signal battalion (16ο ΤΔΒ)
Division HQ Company (ΛΣ/XVI Μ/Κ ΜΠ)
 20th Armored Division (XX ΤΘΜ), based at Kavala, Macedonia organised in
24th Armoured Brigade "1st Cavalry Regiment Florina" (XXIV Τεθωρακισμένη Ταξιαρχία «1ο ΣΙ ΦΛΩΡΙΝΑ»), based at Litochoro
25th Armored Brigade "2nd Cavalry Regiment Ephesus" (XXV ΤΘΤ 2ο Σύνταγμα Ιππικού Έφεσος), based at Xanthi, Thrace
Division Artillery Command and units (ΔΠΒ/ΧΧ ΤΘΜ)
20th Signal Battalion (20ό ΤΔΒ)
Division HQ Company (ΙΣ/ΧΧ ΤΘΜ)
 50th Independent Mechanized Infantry Brigade "Apsos" (50ή M/K ΤΑΞ Άψος), based at Soufli, Thrace
 29th Motorized Brigade "Pogradets" (29η ΤΑΞΠΖ Πόγραδετς), based at Komotini, Thrace

4
Military units and formations established in 1913
1913 establishments in Greece
Xanthi
Military units and formations of Greece in World War I
Military units and formations of Greece in World War II
History of Kavala